Petherick may refer to:

People
Alice Hext (1865–1939), née Petherick, Cornish landowner
Edward Petherick (1847–1917), Australian book collector
Horace William Petherick (1839-1919). A British artist, book illustrator, violin enthusiast and father of Rosa C. Petherick 
John Petherick (1813–1882), Welsh traveller
Maurice Petherick (1894–1985), British politician
Peter Petherick (1942–2015), New Zealand cricketer
Richard Petherick (born 1986), New Zealand hockey player
Rosa C. Petherick (1871–1931), British book illustrator
Vernon Petherick (1876–1945), Australian politician

Places
Hundred of Petherick, a cadastral unit in South Australia
Petherick, South Australia, a locality
Little Petherick, a village and civil parish in Cornwall, England